Businessman is a 2012 Indian Telugu-language action crime film written and directed by Puri Jagannadh. Based on a concept by Ram Gopal Varma and produced by R. R. Venkat under the banner R. R. Movie Makers, the film stars Mahesh Babu, Kajal Aggarwal, and Prakash Raj while Nassar, Sayaji Shinde, Raza Murad, Subbaraju, and Brahmaji play supporting roles.

The film follows Vijay Surya, alias Surya Bhai: a ruthless man who arrives from Andhra Pradesh in Mumbai with aspirations to rule it, just as the Mumbai police declare the end of the "Mafia Raj". He begins his journey by helping a local politician and trapping the city commissioner's daughter. As he becomes a mass saviour with the help of his gang, his real intentions and personal grudges against the corrupt established system get highlighted further. However, he faces violent challenges from his enemies and the cops he supposedly respects.

S. Thaman composed the film's music, and Shyam K. Naidu was the film's cinematographer. The film was made with a budget of 40 crore and was launched formally on 15 August 2011 at Hyderabad. Principal photography began on 2 September 2011 and was shot in Hyderabad, Mumbai and Goa. A few song sequences were shot in Bangkok. Filming ended on 10 December 2011 in 74 working days, one of the shortest periods in which a Telugu film has been shot.

Released during Sankranthi on 13 January 2012. It grossed more than 90 crore and collected a distributor share of 40 crore, eventually becoming one of the highest-grossing Telugu films of 2012. The film was remade in Bengali as Boss in 2013.

Plot 
 
When Mumbai Police Commissioner Ajay Bhardwaj has declared the end of the mafia in the city, a brutal man named Vijay Surya arrives with the intention of conquering Mumbai. Staying at Dharavi with his friend, Surya recruits a group of gangsters and wins the support of a local politician named Laalu after getting a witness killed by his henchman Shakeel. Surya further helps the Dharavi locals clear their debts by making the henchmen rob the original copies of the loan documents in the local branch of Bank of Maharashtra and destroy the bank records. While the locals hail him as their savior, Surya becomes popular and feared for extortion. In order to safeguard himself from Ajay, Surya traps his daughter Chitra Bhardwaj and pretends to fall for her. One day, Surya learns that Central Minister Jaidev Ghanapuleti, who aspires to be the next PM, has sent some assassins to kill him. Surya tricks the men into believing that he is a guide sent to help them where he plants bombs in their food that explodes, resulting in a shootout. While escaping, Surya sees Chitra, who has now learned of his true nature. When arrested, Surya accepts that he trapped her, but now he truly loves her.

However, Ajay is forced to free Surya after his henchmen kidnap Chitra. Surya promises to give up crime in order to live with Chitra, but he decides to set up a business which is untouchable by the police, after his proposal is turned down. Surya starts a company named Surya Exports & Imports as a front for his vigilante acts. In order to set up branch offices all over the country, Surya recruits local gangsters for staff and begins to forcibly extract a 2% tax on every contract made in the respective areas. Eventually, Surya becomes a billionaire, and during the inauguration of his "Business Bank", reveals his thirst for power to Ajay, further citing the decline in crime rate after recruiting the gangsters, and expressing his desire to help the needy. Surya further helps Laalu become the Mayor of Bombay by defeating Arun Gokhle, endorsed and later killed by Jaidev after Arun reveals Jaidev's scams to Ajay. Learning that Jaidev is planning to get both Chitra and Ajay killed, Surya rushes to their house but fails to save Ajay, who tells him to kill Jaidev in his final moments. Surya then reveals to Chitra that he was an American-born Indian whose philanthropist parents were cheated and killed by Jaidev.

As a child, Surya tried to enlist the help of the police but finding none, and he ended up stabbing and shooting Jaidev publicly. Surya meets Guru Govind Patel, the head of the opposition party through Laalu, and offers him 35,000 crore for election campaigning along with the promise to make him the next PM of India. Surya spends crores of rupees per constituency in the nation and also reveals Jaidev's illegal affairs, making him unable to contest in the elections. A vengeful Jaidev kidnaps Chitra, and Surya arrives to rescue her. Jaidev thrashes him and reveals that he gained public sympathy due to Surya's attack as a child, and managed to become a MP. However, Surya gets into a fight with Jaidev's henchmen and leaves them all dead, except one who holds Chitra at knifepoint. Jaidev agrees to free Chitra if Surya dies. Surya shoots himself before shooting both Jaidev and the henchman to death. Chitra accepts her love for Surya, and Guru Govind Patel wins the elections. While recovering in the hospital, Surya delivers a message to the public.

Cast

Production

Development 
Ram Gopal Varma signed Suriya for a multilingual action film titled The Businessman in May 2010, to be directed by Puri Jagannadh simultaneously in Telugu, Tamil and Hindi. The film's protagonist was supposed to be a South Indian coming to Mumbai and setting up a crime business using tact and intelligence to emerge as one of the biggest gangsters. The film's production was expected to begin in October 2010 once Suriya completed his part in 7aum Arivu (2011) and was scheduled for release in the summer of 2011. Jagannadh stated in an interview that principal photography would begin in September 2010. It was speculated that the film was to be based on the real-life story of a gangster who had moved from the Cuddalore district of Tamil Nadu to Mumbai in the late 1960s.

The film was revived later by R. R. Venkat later in January 2011 with a tagline "Guns do not need agreements". He signed Mahesh Babu as the protagonist who worked with Jagannadh in the past for Pokiri (2006). Venkat added that the film would be produced under the banner R. R. Movie Makers. Jagannadh completed the final draft of the film's script on 25 July 2011 during his stay at Bangkok, adding that he was inspired by Ram Gopal Varma. He stated that the pending pre-production work would begin in Hyderabad after a week. The film had its formal launch on 15 August 2011 with a small pooja ceremony conducted at Hyderabad. Shyam K. Naidu and S. Thaman were confirmed as the film's cinematographer and music director respectively.

Casting 

Babu received the film's script while dubbing for Dookudu (2011), but due to that commitment, it took 10 days to finish reading the script. He said in an interview that he could maintain the consistency in the character only because of the fewer working days. Jagannadh did not cast Brahmanandam and Ali because of Babu's specific characterisation; he added that Babu's voice had changed when compared to his performance in Pokiri. Babu also convinced Jagannadh to give up smoking, since he himself was trying to give up after being a chain smoker.

Shruti Haasan was initially considered for the female lead role after her performance in her Telugu film debut, Anaganaga O Dheerudu (2011). However, Kajal Aggarwal was signed as the female lead later in May 2011, marking her first collaboration with both Babu and Jagannadh respectively. She was paid 1 crore for this film. Jagannadh confirmed reports stating Babu and Aggarwal sharing a kiss in the film, adding that he retained them after Babu's wife Namrata Shirodkar approved it. It was reportedly the first onscreen kiss for Babu. Aggarwal explained that it was not supposed to be sensual, but was meant to portray the conflict between two characters, and added that it was shot "aesthetically" by Jagannadh.

Prakash Raj, Nassar, Sayaji Shinde, Dharmavarapu Subramanyam, Brahmaji, and Bandla Ganesh among others were cast for key supporting roles. Hansika Motwani was rumoured to be a part of the film's cast in late August 2011 but not immediately confirmed.  In mid October 2011, Hansika reportedly agreed to perform an item number in the film. She later dismissed those reports as baseless rumours, claiming that other acting assignments keep her away from accepting.

Actress Shweta Bhardwaj was therefore selected to perform the item number instead. She was friends with Jagannadh, and he approached her for this song during the film's shoot at Mumbai, saying that the song suited her and her personality as a dancer. She also tried to understand the meaning of the lyrics while dancing. Bhardwaj was afraid of dancing, suspecting a possible sprain, and found the costumes uneasy, but had to continue upon the choreographer's insistence. Canadian-born Indian actress Ayesha Shiva was signed to play Aggarwal's friend in the film.

Filming 

The film was planned to be shot entirely in and around Mumbai and Jagannadh searched for distinct localities there which suit the script's backdrops. Jagannadh told Venkat that he needed 75 working days to complete the film's shoot. He planned to start with Babu in the first week of September 2011 and established this schedule before finishing in the first week of January 2012. Filming began on 2 September 2011 at Rajiv Gandhi International Airport in Hyderabad.

The second schedule began at Mumbai from 20 September 2011, and Babu confirmed in an interview that it would last until 5 December 2011. An action sequence choreographed by Vijayan was shot in mid October 2011, and it was announced that the film's climax would be shot in and around Goa from 27 October 2011. The song "We Want Bad Boys" was shot in late October 2011. At the same time, Jagannadh planned to shoot a couple of songs with Babu and Aggarwal in Spain during November 2011. The filming of the climax sequences featuring Babu, Prakash Raj, and others was finished by 2 November 2011.

After filming two songs in the districts of Krabi and Pattaya in Bangkok, the film's unit returned to Hyderabad on 2 December 2011 for completing patch work. The film's shooting was wrapped up on 10 December 2011 in 74 working days as expected. Jagannadh revealed in an interview that the film's length by the end of shoot was 84,000 feet as planned. He added that Babu and Aggarwal participated in the film's shoot for 65 and 30 days respectively.

Post production 
The film's dubbing activities began on 15 December 2011 at Shabdalaya Studios in Hyderabad. The DTS mixing works were in progress in early January 2012. The Central Board of Film Certification passed the film with an 'A' certificate; board members found few of the film's dialogues offensive and potentially upsetting to the people of Mumbai. Despite being set in Mumbai, the film features dialogue in Telugu, a language that is not native to the city for the convenience of the viewers. A disclaimer at the beginning of the film is given regarding the same.

Music 

The soundtrack consists of six songs composed by S. Thaman and written by Bhaskarabhatla Ravi Kumar. Aditya Music acquired the audio rights. The original version of the soundtrack was released on 21 December 2011, along with the dubbed Tamil and Malayalam versions at Shilpakala Vedika in Hyderabad. Na. Muthukumar and Kailas Rishi wrote the lyrics for the dubbed Tamil and Malayalam versions of the songs respectively. The soundtrack sold nearly 200,000 compact discs on the first day of its release itself.

Marketing 
A first-look teaser of 41 seconds was released on 9 November 2011. The first-look poster featuring a still of Mahesh sitting in a chair and deeply thinking was revealed on 11 November 2011 (11.11.11), receiving a positive response. Two posters featuring Babu were unveiled on 5 and 11 December 2011. The theatrical trailer was attached to the prints of Panjaa (2011) to be screened in theatres from 9 December 2011.

As a part of the film's promotion, Aditya Music offered a range of ringtone packs. Contests were introduced where the winners won posters autographed by Babu, the film's tickets, and soundtrack discs apart from others.

Release

Theatrical
The film was initially planned for a worldwide release on 11 January 2012. Hari Venkateswara Pictures acquired the film's overseas distribution rights and after requests by non-Telugu Babu fans, it was the first Telugu film to release with subtitles in overseas cinemas. The makers planned for a release in new international markets like Japan and Dubai to cash in on Babu's previous film, Dookudu. The release was postponed by two days to 13 January 2012 due to post production delays. 2,000 screens across the world were booked for the film's initial release.

It was released to 92 screens across Hyderabad, breaking the previous record set by Oosaravelli (2011) which was released to 70 screens. Prasads IMAX screened 33 shows on the release day. The film's Tamil dubbed version, also titled Businessman, was released on 7 December 2012 to 200 screens across Tamil Nadu.

Home media 
Jagannadh acquired the satellite rights of the film during his negotiations with the film's producers for 5 crore. He wanted to rotate the film screening on various channels, at appropriate times, in a bid to gain more widespread viewership and recoup his investment. Studio N acquired the film's television broadcast rights in March 2012 for 6.6 crore, which were later sold to Gemini TV. The film's DVD and Blu-ray discs were produced by Universal Home Entertainment and were released in May 2012.

Legal issues and criticism 

S. Thaman was criticised for copying the tunes of the Italian partisan song "Bella ciao" for the song "Pilla Chao" and "He Lives in You", a song written and performed by Lebo M and his South African Choir for the album Rhythm of the Pride Lands (1995), for the song "Chandamama". "Pilla Chao" was one of the more successful songs on the soundtrack and many music lovers left angry comments about the plagiarism on the song's YouTube video.

The makers violated the rules of The Cinematograph Act, 1952, and the Central Board of Film Certification regarding the re-working of its title from The Businessman to Businessman after the board cleared the film with the former title. The Andhra Pradesh Film Chamber of Commerce cleared the registration of the film title as The Businessman on 1 January 2011 through a letter and was renewed up to 22 April 2012. The set of posters sent to the board for certification purposes carried the full title. The film was publicised without the definite article, which was also missing from the posters. Also, the 'A' certification was omitted.

After release, the film was criticised for the usage of curse-words by the protagonist and a few intimate sequences between the lead pair. The muting of a few dialogues and blurring of a few visuals by the board were criticised by viewers. Bajrang Dal lodged a complaint with Municipal police on 14 January 2012 stating that the lyrics of the song "We love Bad Boys" contained vulgar words and conveyed an unacceptable meaning for which they demanded action against Jagannadh. The police confirmed this and stated they would seek legal opinions for taking further action.

Akhil Bharatiya Vidyarthi Parishad activists entered the Aradhana Theatre at Tarnaka near Osmania University, and stopped a screening on 25 January 2012 at 11:30 AM. They stole the film's reels and ripped off the film's hoardings and flexies at the theatre, protesting a few dialogues which allegedly demeaned Rama and were anti-patriotic. They burnt the film's reels in front of Osmania Arts College in protest of the lyrics of the song "We want Bad Boys" alleging that the song was filled with abusive words. They also demanded a public apology by Babu and Jagannadh. Journalist Rohit Vats in his article Real and reel: How Telugu cinema celebrates stalking mentioned the sequences in Businessman quoting, "The conversation between Mahesh Babu and Kajal Aggarwal in Businessman was termed vulgar but later it was accepted in the name of sarcasm. Basically, it was perceived as harmless teasing".

Reception

Box office 
Businessman opened to 85% occupancy in both single screens and multiplexes at AP/Nizam box office on its first day. It grossed approximately 18.73 crore and collected a share of 13.78 crore at the global box office on its first day creating an all-time record in terms of opening day collections. The film collected a distributor share of 12 crore in AP/Nizam box office, 1 crore in Karnataka, 75 lakh together in Tamil Nadu (for the Tamil version), Orissa and North India respectively and 3 crore together in the United States, United Kingdom, Australia and Japan on its first day.

The film collected approximately 41.83 crore by the end of its first week at the global box office and was declared a blockbuster. The film completed a 50-day run in 350 centres on 3 March 2012, and a 100-day run in undisclosed number of centres on 21 April 2012. The film collected a distributor share of 44.8 crore and grossed over 55 crore in its lifetime at the global box office.

Critical response 
Suresh Krishnamoorthy of The Hindu called Businessman a "wholesome package" and a "pure entertainer", quoting "Puri Jagannath has proved that he's still the director with the Midas touch with his latest release, Businessman". Y. Sunita Chowdary, also from The Hindu, wrote "The Businessman has a mix of action, image, dialogue and montage but what makes it entertaining is that all the above quantities are inextricably bound and linked together at every level with an admirably tight script." She added that Jagannadh did not make any structural, technical or content errors, although the story was a regular one. Suresh Kavirayani of The Times of India gave the film 3.25 out of 5 stars and called the film an "unpretentious entertainer that manages to strike the right balance", which according to him, had enough in it to keep the viewers interested till the end despite not being a spectacular production.

Indo-Asian News Service (IANS) gave the film 3 out of 5 stars and called Businessman a film for Babu's fans and highlighted Babu's performance and Jagannadh's dialogues as the film's strong points. Another reviewer from IANS called the film "senseless yet entertaining" and stated "Mahesh's dashing performance as a mafia kingpin with a hidden personal agenda is commendable and deserves high appreciation. Businessman may be perverse and appeal only to the masses, yet is a winner for unexplainable reasons." Radhika Rajamani of Rediff.com gave the film 2.5 out of 5 stars and opined that Businessman was an entertaining film if watched uncritically. She added, "There's no doubt that Puri Jagan has played to the gallery and kept the masses and Mahesh's image in mind while conceiving this film. It's just Mahesh all the way."

Sify felt that the film was strictly for Babu's fans but praised Jagannadh's work saying that the "story sounds far fetched, demanding logic. The screenplay is a saving grace, which works like magic, making the audiences forget the monotony in between." The reviewer highlighted Mahesh's performance, the dialogues, and the songs as the film's stronger elements. Ramchander of Oneindia Entertainment called Businessman a serious film with limited appeal, which might be enjoyed by Babu's fans but which would be an average for others. B. V. S. Prakash of Deccan Chronicle gave the film 2 out of 5 stars and stated "Businessman is a typical Mahesh Babu film all the way, evoking laughs with comic one-liners and subtle expressions. However, his efforts could go in vain thanks to a contrived and highly exaggerated plot." IndiaGlitz called Businessman a "Mahesh-Magnified film" and stated, "It is clear that the director throws all logic to the winds in the hope that Mahesh the Prince and a few cheeky one-liners will salvage the film. There is so much meaningless lecturing in the movie in the form of the demented arguments that our hero employs in many a scene."

Accolades

Remakes 
After Babu refused to perform in the Hindi remake of this film, Jagannadh approached Ranbir Kapoor in late January 2012 and arranged a special screening for him. Ram Gopal Varma confirmed in March 2012 that he and Jagannadh would remake the film in Hindi with Abhishek Bachchan playing the role of Mahesh Babu in the original. The film was remade in Bengali as Boss in 2013.

Sequel 
Jagannadh expressed interest in making a sequel of the film after the response to the original on its first day and planned to begin work on the same from late 2012. Mahesh Babu too confirmed the same in late January 2012 during the scripting stage of the sequel titled Businessman 2. It was planned as a bilingual film to be shot in Telugu and Hindi simultaneously. Ram Gopal Varma also expressed interest after listening to the script and felt that the sequel would do much better business than the original. However, Jagannadh shelved the sequel in early August 2012 and opted to direct Mahesh Babu in an original film.

Notes

References

External links 
 

2012 films
2010s Telugu-language films
2012 crime action films
2010s vigilante films
Indian crime action films
Indian vigilante films
2012 masala films
Gun fu films
Films scored by Thaman S
Films about organised crime in India
Films about criminals
Films directed by Puri Jagannadh
Films set in Mumbai
Films shot in Mumbai
Indian films about revenge
Indian films based on actual events
Telugu films remade in other languages
Fictional portrayals of the Maharashtra Police
Indian gangster films